Carabus alexandrae cratocephaloides is a subspecies of black coloured beetle in the family Carabidae that is endemic to Gansu, China.

References

alexandrae cratocephaloides
Beetles described in 1887
Beetles of Asia
Endemic fauna of Gansu
Taxa named by Andrey Semyonov-Tyan-Shansky